Bhagta Bhai ka is a small town in the Bathinda district which is about 38 km away from Bathinda city, recently it has become sub tehsil after Phul town of assembly area Rampura Phul  Punjab, Gurduwara Mehal sahib and Bhoota wala khoo are the famous places of this town India. People of 10 adjacent villages from all directions visit this town for shopping and their living needs. Famous Punjabi lyricist, Karamjit puri bhagta bhai ka, is named after this town.

Demographics
Predominantly occupied by Sidhu Brar clan, the village is well known for its historical Gurudwara made around an old holy water well called 'Bhootan Wala Khoo'(well of spirits). Bhagta Bhai Ka is now a sub tehsil.
The village is also known for some prominent figures such as Pradumann Singh who was an Asian shot put champion.

Economy
This town is also very famous for the agricultural machinery manufactured here. The Thrasher, Duster and Harvester manufactured here are famous throughout India. Most people living in town area hail from surrounding villages and are contributing enormously to the local community which was basically a village.

References 

Villages in Bathinda district